Surfer Rosa is the debut studio album by the American alternative rock band Pixies, released in March 1988 on the British label 4AD. It was produced by Steve Albini. Surfer Rosa contains many of the elements of Pixies' earlier output, including Spanish lyrics and references to Puerto Rico. It includes references to mutilation and voyeurism alongside experimental recording techniques and a distinctive drum sound.

As 4AD was an independent label, distribution in the United States was handled by British label Rough Trade Records; however, it failed to chart in either country. Only one single was released, a rerecorded version of "Gigantic", and reached number 93 on the UK Singles Chart. Surfer Rosa was rereleased in the US by Elektra Records in 1992, and in 2005 was certified gold by the Recording Industry Association of America.

Surfer Rosa is often included on critics' lists of the best rock albums. Alternative rock artists including Billy Corgan and PJ Harvey have cited it as an inspiration; it was an influence on Nirvana's 1993 album In Utero.

Background
Before the release of Pixies' debut mini-album Come On Pilgrim in October 1987, Ivo Watts-Russell, head of 4AD, suggested they return to the studio to record a full-length album. The original plan was to record new material at Fort Apache Studios, where the band had produced The Purple Tape and Come On Pilgrim. However, due to differences between the band's manager Ken Goes and The Purple Tape producer Gary Smith, Pixies ended up looking for a new producer and recording studio. On the advice of a 4AD colleague, Watts-Russell looked to hire Steve Albini, ex-frontman of Big Black, as the record's engineer and producer. Having sent a pre-release tape of Come On Pilgrim to Albini, Pixies' manager, Ken Goes, invited him to a Boston dinner party at drummer David Lovering's house a few weeks after Come On Pilgrim's release.

Albini met the band that evening, and they discussed how the next record should sound and be recorded. Albini said that, "[the band and I] were in the studio the next day." Paul Q. Kolderie, who had worked at Fort Apache Studios with Smith, recommended the Boston recording studio Q Division to Albini. This created tension between Smith and Kolderie, and Kolderie later remarked that "Gary almost killed me for the suggestion, he thought I was scheming to get the project."

Recording and production 
Pixies entered Q Division in December 1987, booking ten working days of studio time in which to record the album. 4AD allocated the band a budget of US$10,000. Albini's producer's fee was US$1,500, and he received no royalties; Albini has a practice of refusing royalties from records he produces, viewing it as "an insult to the band." Along with Albini in the studio, Q Division's Jon Lupfer acted as studio assistant. The recording process took the entire booked period of ten working days to complete, with extra vocal mixes subsequently added in the studio. Albini planned to mix the record "somewhere else", but according to Lupfer, "He was unhappy there with it."

Albini's recording techniques 
During  Kim Deal's vocals takes during "Where Is My Mind?" and "Gigantic", he moved the equipment to record into a studio bathroom to achieve more "roomy" echo. John Murphy, Deal's then husband, said that "Albini didn't like the studio sound. Albini later said that the record could have been completed in a week, but "we ended up trying more experimental stuff basically to kill time and see if anything good materialized." An example was "Something Against You", where Albini filtered Black Francis' voice through a guitar amp for "a totally ragged, vicious texture."

Studio banter 
The recording of a conversation held between Francis and Albini can be heard at the end of "Oh My Golly!". Lupfer writes that "it was a concept he [Albini] was going for to get some studio banter." As Deal was leaving the studio to smoke a cigarette, she exclaimed "If anybody touches my stuff, I'll kill ya." Francis replied with "I'll kill you, you fucking die, if anybody touches my stuff". The track begins at this point, with Francis explaining the conversation to Albini, whose voice is not heard on the track. Lupfer later admitted that Albini knew "perfectly well what was going on."

"I'm Amazed" begins with Deal recounting a story in which one of her former teachers who was "into field hockey players" was discreetly fired. Francis finishes Deal's sentences, joking that her response to hearing of the teacher's activities was to try to join the team. Albini later observed the use of studio banter on Surfer Rosa: "It's on their record forever so I think now they are obliged to say that they're ok with it, but I honestly don't know that that idea would've ever come up if I hadn't done it. There are times when things like that are revealing and entertaining and I kind of felt it was a bit gimmicky on this record."

Music 

Like Come On Pilgrim, Surfer Rosa displays a mix of musical styles; pop guitar songs such as "Broken Face", "Break My Body", and "Brick Is Red" are featured alongside slower, more melodic tracks exemplified by "Where Is My Mind?". The album includes heavier material, and prominently features the band's trademark quiet-loud dynamic. Frontman and principal songwriter Black Francis wrote the material, the only exception being "Gigantic," which was co-written with Kim Deal. "Gigantic" is one of only two Pixies album tracks on which Deal sang lead vocals.

Surfer Rosa's lyrical content includes examinations of mutilation and incest in "Break My Body" and "Broken Face", while references to superheroes appear on "Tony's Theme". Voyeurism appears in "Gigantic", and surrealistic lyrics are featured on "Bone Machine" and "Where Is My Mind?". Puerto Rico references and Spanish lyrics are found on the tracks "Oh My Golly!" and "Vamos." The latter track was previously featured on Come On Pilgrim, and appears on Surfer Rosa as a rerecorded version of the original song. Many of the themes explored on previous recordings are revisited on Surfer Rosa; however, unlike on the band's later albums, the songs in Surfer Rosa are not preoccupied with one overarching topic.

Other unusual and offbeat subject matter is raised on the album. "Cactus" is narrated by a prison inmate who requests his girlfriend smear her dress with blood and mail it to him. "Gigantic" is about an illicit love affair and borrows from the 1986 film Crimes of the Heart, in which a married woman falls in love with a teenager. Francis was inspired to write "Where Is My Mind?" after scuba diving in the Caribbean. He later said he had "this very small fish trying to chase me. I don't know why—I don't know too much about fish behavior."

Release 
Surfer Rosa was released in the UK by 4AD on March 21, 1988, entering the UK Indie Chart the following week. It spent 60 weeks in the chart, peaking at number 2. Until August of that year it was only available in the U.S. as an import. Although the label held worldwide distribution rights to Pixies, they did not have access to a distributor outside the UK. When 4AD signed a distribution deal with Rough Trade's U.S. branch, the album was released on vinyl and cassette as part of the Surfer Rosa/Come On Pilgrim release. While Surfer Rosa/Come On Pilgrim has remained in print on CD in the UK, subsequent U.S. releases have seen the two released on separate CDs. These separate releases first appeared in January 1992, when Elektra Records first reissued the band's first two albums.  After 4AD reacquired rights to the band's U.S. distribution, they released both as separate CDs. Surfer Rosa was certified gold by the Recording Industry Association of America in 2005, 17 years after its original release.

"Gigantic" was the only single taken from Surfer Rosa. The track and its B-side, "River Euphrates", were rerecorded by Gil Norton at Blackwing Studios in London, early in May 1988. The remixed single was well met by critics. The single failed to sell, and spent just one week at number 93 on the UK Singles Chart. Despite the poor commercial performance of both Surfer Rosa and "Gigantic", Ivo Watts-Russell has said that the response to the album was "times five" compared with Come On Pilgrim.

Packaging 

Surfer Rosas cover artwork features a photograph of a topless "friend of a friend" of the band, posing as a flamenco dancer, pitched against a wall which displays a crucifix and a torn poster. Simon Larbalestier, who contributed pictures to all Pixies album sleeves, decided to build the set because "we couldn't find the atmosphere we wanted naturally." According to Larbalestier, Black Francis came up with the idea for the cover as he wrote songs in his father's "topless Spanish bar"; Larbalestier added the crucifix and torn poster, and they "sort of loaded that with all the Catholicism." Commenting on the cover in 2005, Francis said, "I just hope people find it tasteful." The cover booklet expands on the theme, and features photographs of the flamenco dancer in several other poses; there are no song lyrics or written content, apart from album credits, in the booklet.

Albini's name does not appear on the original record sleeve. The booklet's photographs were taken in one day at a pub opposite the 4AD offices, because, according to Larbalestier, "it was one of the few places that had a raised stage". In a 1988 interview with Joy Press, Black Francis described the concept as referring to "a surfer girl," who "walks along the Beach of Binones, has a surfboard, very beautiful." When questioned about the topless element, he replied, "For the first record, I told them I liked nudity. I like body lines—not necessarily something in bad taste, didn't even have to be female, just body lines ... like that Obsession ad, you know?" According to Melody Maker, the album was originally entitled "Gigantic" after Deal's song, but the band feared misinterpretation of the cover and changed it to "Surfer Rosa." The "name" of the cover woman, and the album title, comes from the "Oh My Golly!" lyric "Besando chichando con surfer rosa", which roughly translates to "Kissing, having sex with Surfer Rosa".

Critical reception 

UK music press reviews of Surfer Rosa were generally positive. Q's Ian Cranna wrote that "what sets the Pixies apart are their sudden bursts of memorable pop melody," and noted that "they could have a bright future ahead of them." NMEs Mark Sinker, reviewing the album in March 1988, said "they force the past to sound like them", while Dave Henderson from Underground magazine found the songs "well crafted, well delivered sketches which embrace commercial ideals as well as bizarre left-field out of control moments". John Dougan of American music magazine Spin described it as "beautifully brutal", and the magazine later named Pixies their musicians of the year. In a less enthusiastic contemporary review for The Village Voice, Robert Christgau found the band's guitar riffs recognizable and their strong rhythms unique, but felt they had been overrated by critics who hailed them as "the Amerindie find of the year". In a 2003 review of the Pixies' 2002 self-titled EP, Christgau wrote that while he initially found Francis' fey and philosophically limited lyrics somewhat annoying, Surfer Rosa now seemed "audaciously funny and musically prophetic".

At the end of 1988, Surfer Rosa was named one of the year's best albums on English critics' year-end lists. Independent music magazines Melody Maker and Sounds named Surfer Rosa as their album of the year; NME and Record Mirror placed the album 10th and 14th, respectively. However, Surfer Rosa failed to appear on The Village Voices Pazz & Jop, an annual poll of American critics. It also did not appear on any end-of-year list in the United States. A number of music magazines have since positioned Surfer Rosa as one of the quintessential alternative rock records of the 1980s. The album has appeared on several all-time best album lists, and is consistently placed as one of the best albums of the 1980s in any genre.

As of 2015, sales in the United States have exceeded 705,000 copies, according to Nielsen SoundScan.

Legacy 
Both Surfer Rosa and Steve Albini's production of the album have been influential on alternative rock, and on grunge in particular. Nirvana's Kurt Cobain cited Surfer Rosa as the basis for Nevermind's songwriting. When he first heard the album, Cobain discovered a template for the mix of heavy noise and pop he was aiming to achieve. He remarked in 1992 that he "heard songs off of Surfer Rosa that I'd written but threw out because I was too afraid to play them for anybody." Cobain hired Albini to produce Nirvana's 1993 album In Utero, primarily due to his contribution to Surfer Rosa. The Smashing Pumpkins' Billy Corgan described Surfer Rosa as "the one that made me go, 'holy shit'. It was so fresh. It rocked without being lame." Corgan was impressed by the album's drum sound, and acknowledged that The Smashing Pumpkins used to study the record for its technical elements. Musician PJ Harvey said that Surfer Rosa "blew my mind," and that she "immediately went to track down Steve Albini." Cobain listed Surfer Rosa as one of the top 50 albums he thought were most influential to Nirvana's sound in his journal in 1993.

People connected with the band were impressed by the record. Ivo Watts-Russell recalled: "I remember when I first heard Surfer Rosa thinking, 'I didn't know the Pixies could sound like The Fall.' That was my immediate reaction, in other words, incredibly raw." Gary Smith, who at the time was in a disagreement with the band, admitted he "was really happy that they had made such a forceful, aggressive, record." Dinosaur Jr.'s J Mascis, comparing the record to the later Pixies albums Bossanova and Trompe le Monde, said he thought that Steve Albini's production "sounded way better than the other ones."

In 1991, as Pixies were recording Trompe le Monde, Albini told the fan magazine Forced Exposure that Surfer Rosa was "a patchwork pinch loaf from a band who at their top dollar best are blandly entertaining college rock", and said of the band: "Their willingness to be 'guided' by their manager, their record company and their producers is unparalleled. Never have I seen four cows more anxious to be led around by their nose rings." In 2005, Albini apologized for the remarks, saying: "To this day I regret having done it. I don't think that I regarded the band as significantly as I should have."

Accolades
The information regarding accolades attributed to Surfer Rosa is adapted from Acclaimedmusic.net.

(*) designates unordered lists.

Track listing 
All tracks written by Black Francis, except where noted.

Notes 
 For the Surfer Rosa/Come On Pilgrim release, the eight tracks of Come On Pilgrim appear after "Brick is Red".
 The untitled eleventh track consists of a quiet recording of conversation in the studio. It exists as a separate track on some CD releases but is not listed on the artwork. As such, after track 10, the track listing numbering on the artwork does not match actual tracks on those CDs.
 The album was re-mastered and released in 2007 as a Hybrid Super Audio CD disc by Mobile Fidelity Sound Lab from recently discovered, first-generation analog original master tapes. The studio banter that makes up the untitled track on other releases is on the same track as "Oh My Golly!".

Personnel 
All information taken from the CD release of Surfer Rosa.
Pixies
 Black Francis – vocals, rhythm guitar, acoustic guitar
 Kim Deal – bass, vocals, lead vocals on "Gigantic" (credited as Mrs. John Murphy)
 Joey Santiago – lead guitar
 David Lovering – drums
Technical
 Steve Albini – production, audio engineering
 Simon Larbalestier, Vaughan Oliver – cover image, album booklet imagery
 Published by Rice 'n' Beans Music BMI

Certifications and sales

References 
 Frank, Josh; Ganz, Caryn. "Fool the World: The Oral History of a Band Called Pixies". Virgin Books, 2005. .
 Sisario, Ben. "Doolittle 33⅓." Continuum, 2006. .

External links 

Surfer Rosa (Adobe Flash) at Radio3Net (streamed copy where licensed)
 Surfer Rosa at Last.fm

1988 debut albums
4AD albums
Albums produced by Steve Albini
Elektra Records albums
Spanish-language albums
Pixies (band) albums
Rough Trade Records albums
Grunge albums
Art punk albums